The 2018 1000Bulbs.com 500 was a Monster Energy NASCAR Cup Series race that was held on October 14, 2018, at Talladega Superspeedway in Lincoln, Alabama. Contested over 193 laps – extended from 188 laps due to an overtime finish, on the 2.66 mile (4.2 km) superspeedway, it was the 31st race of the 2018 Monster Energy NASCAR Cup Series season, the fifth race of the Playoffs, and second race of the Round of 12. This was a notable race for Stewart-Haas Racing, who dominated in qualifying and both stages, and ended up winning the race with driver Aric Almirola

Report

Background

Talladega Superspeedway, originally known as Alabama International Motor Superspeedway (AIMS), is a motorsports complex located north of Talladega, Alabama. It is located on the former Anniston Air Force Base in the small city of Lincoln. The track is a tri-oval and was constructed in the 1960s by the International Speedway Corporation, a business controlled by the France family. Talladega is most known for its steep banking and the unique location of the start/finish line that's located just past the exit to pit road. The track currently hosts the NASCAR series such as the Monster Energy NASCAR Cup Series, Xfinity Series and the Camping World Truck Series. Talladega is the longest NASCAR oval with a length of  tri-oval like the Daytona International Speedway, which also is a  tri-oval.

Entry list

Final Practice

Qualifying

Qualifying results

Corey LaJoie started from the rear after failing post-qualifying inspection.

Race

Stage Results

Stage 1
Laps: 55

Stage 2
Laps: 55

Final Stage Results

Stage 3
Laps: 78

Race statistics
 Lead changes: 11 among different drivers
 Cautions/Laps: 8 for 32
 Red flags: 0
 Time of race: 3 hours, 20 minutes and 24 seconds
 Average speed:

Media

Television
NBC Sports covered the race on the television side. Rick Allen, Jeff Burton and six-time Talladega winner Dale Earnhardt Jr. had the call in the booth for the race. Steve Letarte and Dale Jarrett called from the NBC Peacock Pit Box on pit road. Dave Burns, Parker Kligerman, Marty Snider and Kelli Stavast reported from pit lane during the race.

Radio
MRN covered the radio call for the race, which was simulcast on Sirius XM NASCAR Radio.

Standings after the race

Manufacturers' Championship standings

Note: Only the first 16 positions are included for the driver standings.

References

2018 in sports in Alabama
2018 Monster Energy NASCAR Cup Series
NASCAR races at Talladega Superspeedway
October 2018 sports events in the United States